The Courier of Moncenisio (Italian:Il vetturale del Moncenisio ) is a 1916 Italian silent drama film directed by Leopoldo Carlucci and starring Achille Majeroni, Lina Millefleurs and Elda Bruni. It is the first of three film adaptations of the 1852 novel Jean le Coucher by Jean Bouchardy. It was made by the Milan-based Milano Films.

Cast
 Achille Majeroni 
 Lina Millefleurs
Elda Bruni 
 Luigi Serventi
 Tranquillo Bianco 
Agostino Borgato 
A. Cesari 
 Bonaventura Ibáñez

References

Bibliography 
 Goble, Alan. The Complete Index to Literary Sources in Film. Walter de Gruyter, 1999.

External links 
 

1916 films
Italian historical drama films
Italian silent feature films
1910s historical drama films
1910s Italian-language films
Italian black-and-white films
1916 drama films
Silent drama films